Keokuk may refer to:

Keokuk (Sauk chief)

Entities named after Chief Keokuk:

Places:
Keokuk, Iowa, USA
Keokuk County, Iowa, USA
Keokuk Airport, USA
Keokuk-Hamilton Bridge, USA
Keokuk Rail Bridge, USA
Keokuk Avenue, a street in Chatsworth, California, USA

Things:
Keokuk Westerns, a professional baseball team in the National Association in 1875
, several US Navy ships